The 1996 Rolex 24 at Daytona was a 24-hour endurance sports car race held on February 3–4, 1996 at the Daytona International Speedway road course. The race served as the opening round of the 1996 IMSA GT Championship.

Victory overall and in the WSC class went to the No. 4 Doyle Racing Riley & Scott Mk III driven by Wayne Taylor, Scott Sharp, and Jim Pace. Victory in the GTS-1 class went to the No. 01 Brix Racing Oldsmobile Aurora driven by Rob Morgan, Charles Morgan, Joe Pezza, Jon Gooding, and Irv Hoerr. The GTS-2 class was won by the No. 55 Stadler Motorsport Porsche 911 Carrera RSR driven by Enzo Calderari, Lilian Bryner, and Ulli Richter.

Race results
Class winners in bold.

References

External links
 frontstretch.com 
 Car information & images
 Race Results

24 Hours of Daytona
1996 in sports in Florida
1996 in American motorsport